Derlin-3 is a protein that in humans is encoded by the DERL3 gene.

See also 
 Derlin-1
 Derlin-2

References

Further reading